Micromyrtus papillosa is a plant species of the family Myrtaceae endemic to Western Australia.

It blooms between April and October producing white flowers.

It is found on hills and scattered among rocky outcrops in a small area in the Goldfields-Esperance region of Western Australia near Dundas where it grows in sandy or clay soils over ironstone or granite.

References

papillosa
Flora of Western Australia
Plants described in 2002
Taxa named by Barbara Lynette Rye